This is an episode list for the BBC television sitcom Till Death Us Do Part by Johnny Speight, broadcast between 22 July 1965 and 3 April 1992, including Till Death... and In Sickness and in Health.

Till Death Us Do Part
Earlier episodes were produced in black-and-white; all episodes after Series 3 are in colour. The original videotapes of nearly all episodes prior to Series 4 were wiped, although complete or partial recordings of some episodes have been found. Recordings exist of all episodes from Series 4 and later.

Pilot episode

Series 1

Series 2

Easter special

Series 3

Episodes from 1965–1968 known to still exist

Election special

Series 4
This series was released on DVD in the UK as The Complete 1972 Series by Network.

1972 Christmas special

Series 5
This series was released on DVD in the UK as The Complete 1974 Series by Network.

1974 Christmas special

Series 6

Series 7

1980 Christmas special

Till Death...

Series 1 (Series 8)

In Sickness and in Health

Series 1 (Series 9)

1985 Christmas special

Series 2 (Series 10)

1986 Christmas special

Series 3 (Series 11)

1987 Christmas special

Series 4 (Series 12)

1989 Christmas special

Series 5 (Series 13)

1990 Christmas special

Series 6 (Series 14)

Films
 Till Death Us Do Part (1969)
 The Alf Garnett Saga (1972)

Christmas Night with the Stars
Christmas Night with the Stars was a special screened annually on Christmas night, in which the top stars of the BBC appeared in short—typically five- to ten-minute—versions of their programmes. Till Death Us Do Part was among the programmes featured in the 1967 and 1971 specials. No recordings of either of these two segments are known to exist.

Other
 Royal Variety Performance sketch (1972), 
The Thoughts of Chairman Alf (1994 BMG – not shown on TV), 
An Audience with Alf Garnett (5 Apr 1997 LWT), 
A Word with Alf (1997 – a series of short episodes for UK Gold made by Carlton starring Mitchell, McSharry and Brian Murphy), 
The Thoughts of Chairman Alf (23 Sep-4 Nov 1998 LWT).

References

Till Death Us Do Part
Till Death Us Do Part episodes, List of